The first season of the American television series Bones premiered on September 13, 2005, and concluded on May 17, 2006, on Fox. The show aired on Tuesdays at 8:00 pm ET before moving to Wednesdays at 8:00 pm ET in 2006. The season consisted of 22 episodes and averaged 8.9 million viewers.

Cast and characters

Main cast 
 Emily Deschanel as Dr. Temperance "Bones" Brennan, a forensic anthropologist
 David Boreanaz as FBI Special Agent Seeley Booth, the official FBI liaison with the Jeffersonian
 Michaela Conlin as Angela Montenegro, a forensic artist
 Eric Millegan as Zack Addy, Dr. Brennan's lab assistant
 T. J. Thyne as Dr. Jack Hodgins, an entomologist
 Jonathan Adams as Dr. Daniel Goodman, the director of the Jeffersonian Institute

Recurring cast 
 John M. Jackson as FBI Deputy Director Sam Cullen
 Heavy D as Sid Shapiro, owner of Wong Fu's
 Chris Conner as Oliver Laurier, a fanatic of Bones's books
 Patricia Belcher as Caroline Julian, a prosecutor
 Loren Dean as Russ Brennan, Brennan's brother
 Heath Freeman as Howard Epps, a serial killer
 Billy Gibbons as Angela's father
 Ty Panitz as Parker Booth, Booth's son

Episodes

Reception
On Rotten Tomatoes, the season has an approval rating of 67% with an average score of 7.1 out of 10 based on 15 reviews. The website's critical consensus reads, "Despite the reliable presence of Emily Deschanel and David Boreanaz, Bones is a so-so police procedural that does little to capitalize on its novel premise."

DVD release 
The first season of Bones was released on DVD in region 1 on November 28, 2006, in region 2 on October 30, 2006 and in region 4 on January 11, 2007. The set includes all 22 episodes of season one on a 4-dual side disc set in region 1 and a 6-disc set in regions 2 and 4, presented in anamorphic widescreen. Special features include two audio commentaries—"Pilot" by executive producer Barry Josephson and series creator Hart Hanson and "Two Bodies in the Lab" by actors David Boreanaz and Emily Deschanel. Featurettes include "Bones – Inspired By the Life of Forensic Anthropologist Kathy Reichs", "Squints", "The Real Definition", and "Character Profiles". A featurette titled "Will the Real Kathy Reichs Please Step Forward" is exclusive to the region 2 release.

References 

General references

External links 
 
 

2005 American television seasons
2006 American television seasons
Season 01